Jorge Manuel Sotomayor Tello (25 March 1942 – 7 January 2022) was a Peruvian-born Brazilian mathematician who worked on differential equations., bifurcation theory, differential equations of classical geometry.

He is the son of Alfonso Sotomayor Ibarra, an accountant, and Clara Rosa Tello de Sotomayor, a housewife. Brother of Vilma, Luis, Carlos and Alfonso.  He was married to Marilda Antonia de Oliveira Sotomayor.  Father of Leonardo and Mariana.

Sotomayor earned his Ph.D. from the IMPA in 1964 under the supervision of Maurício Peixoto at the age of 22 years.

In the dissertation Estabilidade Estrutural de Primeira Ordem e Variedades de Banach (First order structural stability and Banach manifolds) he presented a geometric reinterpretation and extension of the fruitful notions and results relating bifurcations and stability that were introduced by A. A. Andronov and E. A. Leontovich.

Sotomayor visited the University of California at Berkeley during 1966–1968, where he witnessed the great developments in dynamical systems of that period which took place under the leardship of Stephen Smale.

He was a recipient of Brazil's National Order of Scientific Merit in mathematics. From 1994 until his death in early 2022, he was a member of the Brazilian Academy of Sciences. He also was a   Fellow of John Simon Guggenheim Memorial Foundation (1983).

He also translated essays of Henri Poincaré into Portuguese, which were published in a book under the title .

He is also author of the books  with Carlos Gutierrez, reprinted and updated as Structurally
Configurations of Lines of Curvature and Umbilic Points on Surfaces,

Introduced, with Carlos Gutierrez,  the concept of ``principal configuration`` of curvature lines on surfaces. See Structurally Stable Configurations of Lines of Principal Curvature", Astérisque, França, v. 98–99, p. 195–215, (1982). The ideas leading to his work in this subject—traced back to the classical work of G. Monge, C. Dupin and G. Darboux—are discussed in his essay Monge's Ellipsoid. This research has been elaborared and extended in several directions by Sotomayor and his collaborators to include a large class of the differential equations of classical geometry (for example, the asymptotic lines, the axial curvature lines, the lines of mean curvature) and other classes of manifolds (for example, algebraic surfaces in 3 and 4 four dimensional Euclidean spaces).

 Mauricio Peixoto's Testimonial 

``It is a pleasure to say a few words in this occasion, commemorating the 60th birthday of Sotomayor.
He was my student and got his PhD at IMPA in 1964. At the same time two other IMPA students of mine, Ivan Kupka and Aristides Barreto, also got their doctorates. These were the first doctorates awarded by IMPA. The theses of Sotomayor and Kupka got quick international recognition and were initial steps in the direction of establishing IMPA as a mathematical research institution, strong in Dynamical Systems. Both Sotomayor and Kupka came to IMPA from Peru, Sotomayor through the shortest geodesic and Kupka through an arc with origin in Strasbourg (France). In the wake of Sotomayor a number of Peruvians got their doctorates at IMPA. Among them, Carlos Gutierrez and Cesar Camacho became distinguished mathematicians and professors at IMPA. Currently Camacho is the Director of IMPA.

Sotomayor is certainly one of the pioneers of the modern theory of bifurcation, put in the context of the theory of Dynamical Systems.

This point of view was introduced in his thesis when he considered a 2-dimensional manifold M and on the space of flows on M,    Ω(M), he considered an arc γ and studied the intersection γ ᑕ Σ when Σ ᑕ  Ω(M)  is the set of structurally stable flows on M.

In 1982 Sotomayor, together with C. Gutierrez put the concept of structurally stability in the study of the foliation determined by the lines of principal curvature of an ordinary surface in R3.

This point of view enriched later by the collaboration of R. Garcia and others amounted to a new vision of the classical work of Monge, Dupin, Darboux, Caratheodory.

Let Soto continue to produce for many years to come his beautiful, relevant and down to earth mathematics``.

Death

He passed away on 7 January 2022, at the age of 79.

 Selected publications 

"with C. Gutiérrez: Structurally Stable Configurations of Lines of Principal Curvature", Astérisque, França, v. 98--99, p. 195--215, (1982).''

External links 
(Homepage)
(Lattes CNPq)
 
 
(Researchgate)

References 

1942 births
2022 deaths
Textbook writers
Members of the Brazilian Academy of Sciences
Instituto Nacional de Matemática Pura e Aplicada alumni
Expatriate academics in Brazil
20th-century Brazilian mathematicians
Peruvian emigrants to Brazil
People from Lima